The governing New Democratic Party of Ontario ran a full slate of candidates in the 1995 Ontario provincial election, and fell to third place status with 17 of 130 seats. Many of the party's candidates have their own biography pages; information on others may be found here.

John Sullivan (Nepean)
Sullivan is a labour activist in the Ottawa area. Born in British Columbia, he worked on ships and dredges before entering political life. He became active with the Public Service Alliance of Canada at the beginning of his career, and rose to become president of the Vancouver district area council of PSAC. He coordinated the group's political action committee in the early 1980s, and served for three years as a trustee with the British Columbia Federation of Labour. During the 1983 general strike, he served as chair of the Operation Solidarity Coalition in Prince George. Sullivan joined the NDP in 1976, and has been active with the party since then. He sought the federal New Democratic Party nomination for Prince George for the 1984 federal election, but was defeated.

Sullivan received 3,274 votes (9.29%) in 1995, finishing third against Progressive Conservative John Baird. He remains a member PSAC . He campaigned for the federal New Democratic Party nomination in Carleton—Mississippi Mills for the 2006 election, but lost to Crystal LeBlanc.

David Jacobs (St. Andrew—St. Patrick)
Jacobs is a lawyer based in Toronto, specializing in human rights, international law and labour law. His clients include General Motors workers in 1994 and Stelco employees in 2004-2005 . In 2000, he argued that the New Democratic Party should be represented at an inquiry investigating a tainted water scandal in Walkerton, Ontario which occurred under the watch of Mike Harris's Progressive Conservative government.

He received 2,641 votes (5.16%) in the 1993 election, finishing fourth against Liberal candidate Barry Campbell. Subsequently, Jacobs was nominated as the provincial NDP candidate for a 1995 by-election in St. Andrew—St. Patrick (Toronto Star, 28 February 1995). The by-election was superseded by the 1995 general election, and Jacobs remained as his party's candidate. His campaign focused on issues such as health care and rent control. He finished third against Progressive Conservative candidate Isabel Bassett.

Jacobs was part of the Ad Hoc Committee To Stop Canada's Participation In The War On Yugoslavia in 1999, opposing NATO's bombing campaign in Kosovo. He described the campaign as a violation of international law. During the 2003 invasion of Iraq, he described the foreign policy approach of George W. Bush's American government as a "terrifying doctrine of empire" and "wholly unlawful".

Jeff Burch (St. Catharines)
Jeff Burch received 3,929 votes (13.29%) in 1995, finishing third against Liberal incumbent Jim Bradley.

Arlene Rousseau (Windsor—Sandwich)
Originally from Texas, USA, Rousseau was a committed socialist and social activist in Windsor, Ontario. She was the founder and president of SOC, an organization that fought for the rights of abused children (Windsor Star, 4 March 1995). She campaigned for a seat on the Windsor City Council in 1991, but finished third in Ward Two (two candidates were elected). She was 43 years old when the 1995 election was called.

Her candidacy was controversial, in that she had previously been among the most vocal critics of NDP Premier Bob Rae from within the party itself. She opposed the Rae government's Social Contract legislation in 1993, and became known as a prominent ally of dissident NDP MPP Peter Kormos. She won the Windsor—Sandwich NDP nomination in a shocking upset, defeating Rae's preferred candidate, former Member of Parliament (MP) Howard McCurdy, 58 votes to 55. Party brochures had previously been printed listing McCurdy as the party's candidate. During the campaign, Rousseau was supported by both Kormos and by Windsor's powerful branch of the Canadian Auto Workers union, which had also opposed the Social Contract. She received 6,414 votes (25.31%), finishing second against Liberal candidate Sandra Pupatello.

Rousseau died of cancer in October 1997. Kormos had previously paid tribute to her struggle with the disease on the floor of the Ontario legislature.

References

1995